Zizzi is a chain of Italian-inspired restaurants in the United Kingdom and Ireland. In February 2015, Bridgepoint Capital completed a £250 million acquisition of ASK Italian and Zizzi, and subsequently bought by TowerBrook Capital Partners in 2020.

Locations
Zizzi opened their first restaurant in Chiswick in 1999.

As of March 2022, the Zizzi portfolio includes about twenty five London restaurants.  Other footprints in major cities, include: Birmingham, Bristol, Leeds, Liverpool, Manchester, Nottingham, and Sheffield.

Their restaurant estate also includes: Aberdeen, Cardiff, Dublin, Edinburgh, and Glasgow.

On 17 July 2020, during the COVID-19 pandemic, Azzurri Group, owner of the Zizzi and ASK Italian chains, announced the closure of 75 restaurants with the loss of up to 1,200 jobs.

Notable incidents

Strand self-harm incident
On 22 April 2007, a 35-year-old Polish man entered the Zizzi restaurant on The Strand and made his way into the kitchen, where he obtained a knife he then used to sever his penis in front of diners. 
Whilst it was initially believed that attempts to re-attach the appendage had been unsuccessful, The Guardian reported later that week that surgeons had, in fact, been able to do so, ‘in the first operation of its kind in the country’, a procedure that was carried out at St Thomas’ Hospital after police recovered the penis from the restaurant floor.

Salisbury nerve agent poisoning

The Zizzi in Salisbury was linked to the poisoning of Sergei and Yulia Skripal since the pair had dined there. Advice was given to those who had eaten at the restaurant and the nearby Mill Pub on Sunday 4 or Monday 5 March 2018 to take measures such as washing or wiping their personal belongings, even though the risk of harm to other diners was reported to be "low".

Philanthropy
In the summer of 2011, Zizzi began using the service, Pennies, in all their restaurants to give their customers the option to top up their bill by 20p and donate to charity.

By March 2012, over £50,000 had been raised for charity, with the majority going to long-standing charity partner, The Prince's Trust. Pennies with Zizzi was crowned "Project of the Year" by the Real IT Awards in 2012, also picking up the prize for Corporate, Social and Environmental Responsibility. In 2020, Zizzi won the Lausanne Index Prize - Novel Product of the Year.

See also
 List of Italian restaurants

References

External links

 

Pizza chains of the United Kingdom
Restaurants established in 1999
Restaurant groups in the United Kingdom
Italian restaurants
1999 establishments in the United Kingdom